What Women Love is a lost 1920 American silent comedy drama film directed by Nate Watt and starring Annette Kellerman.

Cast
Annette Kellerman as Annabel Cotton
Ralph Lewis as James King Cotton
Wheeler Oakman as Willy St. John
William Fairbanks as Jack Mortimer (credited as Carl Ullman)
Walter Long as Captain Buck Nelson
Bull Montana as Jose

References

External links

1920 films
American silent feature films
Lost American films
First National Pictures films
American black-and-white films
1920s English-language films
1920 comedy-drama films
1920 lost films
Lost comedy-drama films
Films directed by Nate Watt
1920s American films
Silent American comedy-drama films